Westbury-sub-Mendip is a village in Somerset, England, on the southern slopes of the Mendip Hills  from Wells and Cheddar.

The parish boundary is formed by the River Axe.

History

There is evidence, from flint finds, of occupation of a site, known as Westbury Sleight during the Mesolithic period, which fieldwork during 2007 suggested was a platform cairn with field banks of Bronze Age date. In 1969 traces of an infilled cave were discovered in a limestone quarry which produced numerous bones from extinct animals and flakes of flint and chert.

Westbury-sub-Mendip was listed in the Domesday Book of 1086 as Westberie, meaning 'The west hill under the Mendip Hills' from the Old English west and beorg. It was the property of Gisa, Bishop of Wells. However given the etymology quoted by Ekwall a more likely meaning is 'fortified enclosure west (of Wells)'. The 'fortification' may have been the Iron Age fort above the neighbouring village of Rodney Stoke; or the sub-circular enclosure around a British church or monastery; or around the lord of the manor's hall, now Court House Farm.

The parish was part of the hundred of Wells Forum.

The village once had a railway station on the Cheddar Valley line, also known as the Strawberry Line. The station, known as Lodge Hill, apparently to avoid confusion with Westbury in Wiltshire, is now an industrial estate providing employment for the village. Until recently the former railway line was an airfield for light aircraft.

The village has a number of amenities including a primary school, parish church, post office and pub. Social events include the annual Club Day on Spring Bank Holiday Monday. This involves a parade through the village led by a brass band. The event is organised by The Westbury Friendly Society, which is one of the five surviving Friendly Societies in Somerset. The church of St Lawrence at Westbury was given to the Augustinian canons of Bruton Priory by Robert, Bishop of Bath, in the 12th century. It is a Grade II* listed building.

Westbury-sub-Mendip won the title of Somerset Village of the Year 2006.

During 2009 a K6 Red telephone box in the village was converted into a library or book exchange replacing the services of the mobile library which no longer visits the village.

Governance

The parish council has responsibility for local issues, including setting an annual precept (local rate) to cover the council’s operating costs and producing annual accounts for public scrutiny. The parish council evaluates local planning applications and works with the local police, district council officers, and neighbourhood watch groups on matters of crime, security, and traffic. The parish council's role also includes initiating projects for the maintenance and repair of parish facilities, as well as consulting with the district council on the maintenance, repair, and improvement of highways, drainage, footpaths, public transport, and street cleaning. Conservation matters (including trees and listed buildings) and environmental issues are also the responsibility of the council.

The village falls within the Non-metropolitan district of Mendip, which was formed on 1 April 1974 under the Local Government Act 1972, having previously been part of Wells Rural District, which is responsible for local planning and building control, local roads, council housing, environmental health, markets and fairs, refuse collection and recycling, cemeteries and crematoria, leisure services, parks, and tourism.

Somerset County Council is responsible for running the largest and most expensive local services such as education, social services, libraries, main roads, public transport, policing and fire services, trading standards, waste disposal and strategic planning.

It is also part of the Wells county constituency represented in the House of Commons of the Parliament of the United Kingdom. It elects one Member of Parliament (MP) by the first past the post system of election. It was part of the South West England constituency of the European Parliament prior to Britain leaving the European Union in January 2020, which elected seven MEPs using the d'Hondt method of party-list proportional representation.

Religious sites

The Church of St Lawrence was built in the 12th century. It is a Grade II* listed building.

References

External links 

 Westbury-sub-Mendip website

Villages in Mendip District
Civil parishes in Somerset
Mendip Hills